Kalinówka may refer to the following places:
Kalinówka, Lublin County in Lublin Voivodeship (east Poland)
Kalinówka, Bielsk County in Podlaskie Voivodeship (north-east Poland)
Kalinówka, Sokółka County in Podlaskie Voivodeship (north-east Poland)
Kalinówka, Puławy County in Lublin Voivodeship (east Poland)
Kalinówka, Włodawa County in Lublin Voivodeship (east Poland)
Kalinówka, Zamość County in Lublin Voivodeship (east Poland)
Kalinówka, West Pomeranian Voivodeship (north-west Poland)